Eyvan (also Romanized as Eywān and Aīvān; also known as Eyvān-e Gharb and Jūy Zar; formerly, Bāgh-e Shāh and Bāgh-ī-Shāh) is a city in and capital of Eyvan County, Ilam Province, Iran. At the 2006 census, its population was 27,752, in 6,010 families. The city is populated by Kurds who speak the Kalhori variety of Kurdish.

Demographics 
Language composition:

Infrastructure

Roads
Eyvan is located on road 17 (Iran). The Eyvan-Ilam part which has recently been expanded into a four-lane road is the busiest road in Ilam province. The Eyvan-Ilam route has one tunnel. It is called Payambare Azam tunnel which is 1480 meters long and was inaugurated in February 2010. The 50 Kms Eyvan-Ilam route was made 11 Kms shorter. It replaced the old reno tunnel. Eyvan bypass project is planned to be completed in two years.

There are two secondary roads. The older is to Sumar and the newer to Gilan-e Gharb. Eyvan was connected to Gilan-e Gharb by a new route through nawdar road in 2015. This route has made the distance between the two cities 40 minutes shorter.

References

اطلس گیتاشناسی استان‌های ایران [Atlas Gitashenasi Ostanhai Iran] (Gitashenasi Province Atlas of Iran)

External links
Map of Ilam also showing the location of Eyvan

Populated places in Eyvan County
Cities in Ilam Province
Kurdish settlements in Ilam Province